This is a bibliography of notable works about India.

India history books

Single volume works

Primary sources 
Ancient India
Diodorus Siculus, 1st century BC. "Book II: The East." Pp. 35–60 in Bibliotheca historica.
 Ashokavadana, 2nd century CE
Medieval India
ibn Mubarak, Abu'l-Fazl. 16th century. Ain-i-Akbari, Akbarnama Vol. 3. Full online set.
 Jahangir, Nur-ud-din Muhammad. 16th century. Tuzk-e-Jahangiri.
 Kashmiri, Muhammad Ali. 1642. Tohfatu'l-ahbab.
 Qazvini, Muhammad Amin. 1646. Padshah Nama.

British Raj
Nehru, Jawaharlal. 1946. The Discovery of India.

 
Mill, James. 1817, 1820, 1826. The History of British India, edited by Horace Hayman Wilson (1848, 1858).

Secondary sources
 
 
 
Balagangadhara, S. N. 2012. Reconceptualizing India Studies. New Delhi: Oxford University Press.
 Bryant, Edwin. 2001. The Quest for the Origins of Vedic Culture. Oxford University Press
Chakrabarti, Dilip K. 1997. Colonial Indology. New Delhi: Munshiram Manoharlal.
Durant, W. 2011. The Case for India. Mumbai: Strand Book Stall.
Inden, R. B. 2010. Imagining India. Bloomington, IN: Indiana University Press.
Karkare, Neelesh Ishwarchandra. 2014. Shreenath Madhavji: Mahayoddha Mahadji Ki Shourya Gatha.
Lal, B. B. 1997. The earliest civilization of South Asia: Rise, maturity, and decline. New Delhi: Aryan Books International.
—— 1998. India 1947-1997: New light on the Indus civilization. New Delhi: Aryan Books International.
Lal, K. S. 1980. History of the Khaljis: A.D. 1290-1320. New Delhi: Munshiram Manoharlal.
Adluri, Vishwa, and Joydeep Bagchee. 2014. The Nay Science: A History of German Indology. New York: Oxford University Press. 

Guha, Ramachandra. 2007. India after Gandhi.
 Dharampal. [1983] 1995. The beautiful tree: Indigenous Indian education in the eighteenth century. New Delhi: Biblia Impex Private Limited.
—— 2000. Indian science and technology in the eighteenth century: Some contemporary European accounts. Goa: Other India Press.
 Panikkar, K. M. 1965. Asia and Western dominance. Millswood, AU: Braille Writing Association of South Australia.
 Priolkar, A. K. 1961. "The Goa Inquisition: Being a Quatercentenary Commemoration Study of the Inquisition in India." Bombay University.
Majumdar, Ramesh C. 1962. History of the Freedom Movement in India, 3 vols. Calcutta: K. L. Mukhopadhyay. .
—— 1970. Historiography in Modern India. London: Asia Publishing House.
Majumdar, Ramesh C., Hem C. Raychaudhuri, and Kalikinkar Datta. [1946] 2007. An Advanced History of India. Delhi: Macmillan India.
Trautmann, Thomas. 1997. Aryans and British India. Berkeley: University of California Press.
 Sen, Amartya. 2005. The Argumentative Indian. Farrar, Straus and Giroux.
 
 Elphinstone, Mountstuart. 1841. The History of India, 2 vols. London: John Murray. vol. 1, vol. 2.
 Sachau, Eduard C. 1910. Alberuni's India — An account of ... India about A.D. 1030, 2 vols. London: Kegan Paul, Trench Trubner & Co.Ltd. vol. 1, vol. 2.
 
Elliot, Henry M. 1867–1877. The History of India, as Told by Its Own Historians. The Muhammadan Period, 8 vols., edited by J. Dowson.

Multivolume works
 Firishta, Muhammad. 1794. Ferishta's History of Dekkan..., 2 vols., translated by J. Scott, Jonathan. London: John Stockdale. vol. 1, vol. 2.
Tod, James. 1829, 1832. Annals and Antiquities of Rajasthan, 2 vols. London: Smith, Elder.

Chattopadhyaya, Debbi P., ed. 2009. Project of History of Indian Science, Philosophy and culture, 20 vols. Centre for Studies in Civilizations. 

 
 
Jackson, A. V. Williams, ed. 1906–1907. History of India, 10 vols. London: Grolier Society.
Smith, Vincent Arthur. 1906. History of India, vol. 2: From Sixth century B.C to Mohammedan Conquest.
Lane-Poole, Stanley. 1906. History of India, vol. 3: From Mohammedan Conquest to the Reign of Akbar the Great.
—— 1906. History of India, vol. 4: From Reign of Akbar the Great to the Fall of Moghul Empire.
Elliot, Henry M. 1907. History of India, vol. 5: The Muhammadan Period as Described by Its Own Historians.
Hunter, William Wilson. 1906. History of India, vol. 6: From the first European settlements to the founding of the English East India Company.
—— 1906. History of India, vol. 7: The European struggle for Indian supremacy in the seventeenth century.
Lyall, A. C. 1907. History of India, vol. 8: From the close of the seventeenth century to the present time.
Jackson, A. V. Williams. 1907. History of India, vol. 9: Historic accounts of India by foreign travellers, classic, oriental, and occidental.
Majumdar, Ramesh C. 1951–1969. The History and Culture of the Indian People, 11 vols. Mumbai: Bharatiya Vidya Bhavan.
 Malhotra, Rajiv. 2012. Infinity Foundation series: Contributions to history of Indian science and technology, 20 vols. New Delhi: Pentagon Press.

Race, caste and tribe

Primary sources

Sherring, M. A. 1872–81. Hindoo Tribes and Castes, 3 vols.

Northern India
Crooke, William. 1896. The tribes and castes of the North-western Provinces and Oudh, 4 vols. Calcutta: Office of the Superintendent of Government Printing.
Volume I
Volume II
Volume III
Volume IV
Rose, Horace Arthur, and Edward Douglas MacLagan. 1911–1919. A Glossary of the Tribes and Castes of the Punjab and North-West Frontier Province, 3 vols. Lahore: Samuel T. Weston at the Civil and Military Gazette Press.

Central Provinces
Enthoven, Reginald Edward. 1920–1922. The Tribes and Castes of Bombay, 3 vols. Bombay: Government Central Press.
Russell, Robert Vane. 1916. Tribes and Castes of the Central Provinces of India, 4 vols. Rai Bahadur Hira Lal. London: Macmillan & Co.
Volume I
Volume II
Volume III
Volume IV

Southern India
Thurston, Edgar, and K. Rangachari. 1909. Castes and Tribes of Southern India, 7 vols. Madras: Government Press.
Volume I (A to B)
Volume II (C to J)
Volume III (K)
Volume IV (K to M)
Volume V (M to P)
Volume VI (P to S)
Volume VII (T to Z)

Secondary sources

 Malhotra, Rajiv. 2011. Breaking India: Western Interventions in Dravidian and Dalit Faultlines. Amaryllis. .

Biography
 Basu, Kanailal. 2010. Netaji: Rediscovered.
 Borthwick, Meredith. 1977. Keshub Chunder Sen: a search for cultural synthesis.
 Chakrabarty, D. 2016. The Calling of History: Sir Jadunath Sarkar and His Empire of Truth.
 Collet, Sophia Dobson, and Francis Herbert Stead. 1914. The Life and Letters of Raja Rammohun Roy, edited by Hem Chandra Sarkar.
 Fauja, S., and Gurbachan Singh Talib. 1996. Guru Tegh Bahadur: Martyr and Teacher. Patiala: Punjabi University.
 Geddes, Patrick. 1920. The Life and Work of Sir Jagadis C. Bose.
 Gordon, Leonard A. 1990. Brothers Against the Raj: A Biography of Indian Nationalist Leaders Sarat and Subhas Chandra Bose.
 Hatcher, Brian A. 2014. Vidyasagar: The Life and After-life of an Eminent Indian.
 Hunter, William Wilson. 1889. Rulers of India series, 28 vols.
 Kanigel, Robert. 1991. The Man Who Knew Infinity. 
 Karkare, Neelesh Ishwarchandra. Biography on Great Warrior Shreenath Mahadji Shinde.
 Kaviraj, Krishnadas. 1582. Chaitanya Charitamrita.
 translated in Sarkar, Jadunath, trans. 1922. Chaitanya's Life and Teachings.
 Kling, Blair B. 1976. Partner in Empire: Dwarkanath Tagore and the Age of Enterprise in Eastern India. 
Lal, B. B. 2011. Piecing together: Memoirs of an archaeologist. New Delhi: Aryan Books International.
Majumdar, R. C. 1967. Svami Vivekananda: A Historical Review. Calcutta: General Printers & Publishers.
Max Müller, Friedrich. 1916. Ramakrishna: His Life and Sayings. 
 Mitra, Subal Chandra. 1902. Isvar Chandra Vidyasagar, a story of his life and work. 
 Nasrin, Taslima. 1999. Amar Meyebela - My Girlhood. Calcutta: People's Book House.
 Paul, Samiran Kumar, and Amar Nath Prasad. 2006. Recritiquing Rabindranath Tagore.
 Radhakrishnan, Sarvepalli. 1919. The Philosophy of Rabindranath Tagore.
 Rao, S. R. 2008. Reminiscences of an archaeologist. New Delhi: Aryan Books International.
 Rhys, Ernest P. 1916. Rabindranath Tagore: A Biographical Study.
 Robinson, W. Andrew. 1989. Satyajit Ray: The Inner Eye: The Biography of a Master Film-Maker. vol 1, vol. 2.
 Rolland, Romain. The Life of Ramakrishna.
 —— The Life of Vivekananada and the Universal Gospel.
 Roy, Basanta Koomar. 1915. Rabindranath Tagore – The man and his poetry. (1915: 1; 1916: 2)
 Roy, Samaren. 1986. The Twice-born Heretic, M. N. Roy and Comintern.
 —— 1988. India's First Communist.
 —— 1997. M. N. Roy: A Political Biography.
 Sarkar, Jadunath. 1981. History of Aurangzib. Orient Longman.
 —— 2012. Shivaji and His Times. Orient Longman.
 Sister Nivedita. 1910. The Master as I Saw Him
 Seely, Clinton B. 1990. A Poet Apart: A literary biography of the Bengali poet Jibanananda Das, (1899-1954). 
 Sen, Amiya Prosad. 2008. Bankim Chandra Chattopadhyay: An Intellectual Biography.
 Sengupta, Subodh Chandra. 1977. Bankimchandra Chatterjee.
 Toye, Hugh. 1959. The Springing Tiger.
 Yogananda, Paramahansa. 1946. Autobiography of a Yogi.
The father of modern India: Commemoration volume of the Rammohun Roy centenary celebration, 1933. Rammohun Roy Centenary Committee. 1935.

Biographical dictionaries and encyclopedias

 Samsad Bangali Charitabhidhan, ed. Subodh Chandra Sengupta
 Dictionary of National Biography 4 vols ed. Sibapada Sen
 The Indian Biographical Dictionary (1915) by C. Hayavadana Rao
 Dictionary of Indian biography (1906) by Charles Edward Buckland
 Who's Who in India Supplement 1 (1912)
 Who's Who in India Supplement 2 (1914)
 The Golden Book of India, a genealogical and biographical dictionary of the ruling princes, chiefs, nobles, and other personages, titled or decorated, of the Indian empire (1893) by Roper Lethbridge
 The Oriental Biographical Dictionary (1881) by Thomas William Beale
 Reminiscences and Anecdotes of Great Men of India by Ram Gopal Sanyal Vol 1 (1894), Vol 2 (1895)
 Who's who of Indian Writers, 1999: A-M
 Encyclopaedia of Indian Literature, Volume 1
 Encyclopaedia of Indian Literature, Volume 2
 Encyclopaedia of Indian Literature, Volume 3
 Encyclopaedia of Indian Literature, Volume 5
 Encyclopaedia of Indian Literature: Supplementary entries and index
 Historical Dictionary of the Bengalis (2013) by Kunal Chakrabarti, Shubhra Chakrabarti

Manuals and gazetteers

 Chaudhuri, S. B. 1964. History of the Gazetteers of India. New Delhi: Publication Division.
 
 
 The Imperial Gazetteer of India

Travelogues

Early period 
Indica by Megasthenes, c. 300 BCE
, 414 CE

Great Tang Records on the Western Regions, by Hiuen Tsang. 646 CE.

Majumdar, R. C. (1981). The Classical accounts of India: Being a compilation of the English translations of the accounts left by Herodotus, Megasthenes, Arrian, Strabo, Quintus, Diodorus, Siculus, Justin, Plutarch, Frontinus, Nearchus, Apollonius, Pliny, Ptolemy, Aelian, and others with maps. Calcutta: Firma KLM.

Early modern period 
 
 

Meenakshi Jain, The India They Saw (co-edited with Sandhya Jain, 4 Volumes, Prabhat Prakashan), .

Late modern 
Emily Eden. Up the Country
 
 Begums Thugs and White Mughals. Fanny Parkes, ed. William Dalrymple. 2002
 The Hill of Devi. E. M. Forster, 1953.
 A Walk Along the Ganges. Dennison Berwick. 1985.
 India: A Million Mutinies Now. V. S. Naipaul. 1990.

Provinces
Holland, Thomas Henry, ed. Provincial Geographies of India.

Biodiversity and environment
 Karan, P. P. "Environmental movements in India." Geographical Review 84#1 (1994): 32-41. online 
 Nayak, Arun Kumar. "Environmental movements in India." Journal of developing societies 31.2 (2015): 249-280. online

 Saravanan, Velayutham. Environmental History of Modern India: Land, Population, Technology and Development (Bloomsbury Publishing India, 2022) online review; also see excerpt at Amazon]

 Shiva, Vandana. "Ecology Movements in India", in Oomen, T. K. (Ed.), Social Movements: Issues of Identity (Oxford University Press, New Delhi, 2011)
 Turaga, Rama Mohana R., and Anish Sugathan. "Environmental regulations in India." in Oxford Research Encyclopedia of Environmental Science (2020) online

Flora

Fauna
Lepidoptera Indica
The Fauna of British India, Including Ceylon and Burma
Fletcher, Thomas B., and Charles M. Inglis. 1924. Birds of an Indian Garden. Calcutta & Simla: Thacker, Spink & Co.
Marshall, George F. L. and Lionel de Nicéville. Butterflies of India, Burmah and Ceylon.

Princely states

People, politics and customs

 

 
 
Kishwar, M., & Vanita, R. (1996). In search of answers: Indian women's voices from Manushi : a selection from the first five years of Manushi. Daryaganj, New Delhi: Manohar.

 
 
 
 
 Goel, S. R. 1998. Vindicated by Time: The Niyogi Committee Report on Christian Missionary Activities. Madhya Pradesh: Christian Missionary Activities Enquiry Committee.

Religion, culture and arts

Coomaraswamy, Ananda Kentish. 1909. The Indian Craftsman. London: Probsthain.
 
Ghose, Aurobindo. 1998. The Foundations of Indian Culture. Pondicherry: Sri Aurobindo Ashram.

Gupta, S. P., and S. Asthana. 2007. Elements of Indian Art: Including Temple Architecture, Iconography & Iconometry. New Delhi: Indraprastha Museum of Art and Archaeology.
Gupta, S. P., & Shastri Indo-Canadian Institute. 2011. The Roots of Indian Art: A detailed study of the formative period of Indian art and architecture, third and second centuries B.C., Mauryan and late Mauryan. Delhi: B.R. Publishing Corporation.

Kak, S. 2015. The Wishing Tree: Presence and Promise of India. Delhi: Aditya Prakashan.
Kishwar, M. (1989). Manushi: Women Bhakta poets. New Delhi: Manushi Trust.
Lokesh, Chandra, and T. Chandrika. 1997. Cultural Horizons of India. New Delhi: Aditya Prakashan.
Malhotra, Rajiv. 2011. Being Different: An Indian Challenge to Western Universalism. HarperCollins India. .
—— 2016. Battle for Sanskrit. Harper Collins India. .
Robinson, W. Andrew. 1989. Satyajit Ray: The Inner Eye: The Biography of a Master Film-Maker. vol 1, vol. 2.
Sethna, K. D. (1989). Ancient India in a New Light. New Delhi: Aditya Prakashan.

Performance art 

 
 
 
 Shourie, Arun. 1979. Hinduism, Essence and Consequence: A Study of the Upanishads, the Gita, and the Brahma-Sutras. Sahibabad, District. Ghaziabad: Vikas.

Religion, folk tales, and spiritual heritage 

 
 Crooke, William. 1896. An Introduction to the Popular Religion and Folklore of Northern India (revised and illustrated ed.), 2 vols. North-Western Provinces and Oudh: Government press.
Volume I
Volume II
 Dayananda, S., and C. Bharadwaja. 1932. Light of Truth, or, An English translation of the Satyartha Prakasha: The Well-Known Work of Swami Dayananda Saraswati. Madras: Arya Samaj.
 Elst, K. 2014. Decolonizing the Hindu Mind: Ideological Development of Hindu Revivalism. New Delhi: Rupa.
 Frawley, David. 2014. How I became a Hindu: My Discovery of Vedic Dharma.
 —— 2015. Shiva: The Lord of Yoga. Lotus Press.
Gautier, Francois. 2008. The Guru of Joy: Sri Sri Ravi Shankar & the Art of Living. Carlsbad, Calif: Hay House.

Klostermaier, K. K. 2007. A Survey of Hinduism. Albany: State University of New York Press.
Malhotra, Rajiv. 2014. Indra's Net: Defending Hinduism's Philosophical Unity. HarperCollins India. .

Narain, H. 1983. Facets of Indian Religio-Philosophic Identity. Delhi u.a: Bharatiya Vidya Prakashan.
Prabhavananda, Swami. 1962. The Spiritual Heritage of India.
 Radhakrishnan, Sarvepalli. 1953. The Principal Upanishads.
 Shourie, Arun. 2017. Two Saints: Speculations around and about Ramakrishna Paramahamsa and Ramana Maharishi. Harper Collins.
 Shourie, Arun, and S. R. Goel. 2009. Hindu Temples, What Happened to Them.
 Swarup, R., and David Frawley. 2001. The Word as Revelation: Names of Gods. New Delhi: Voice of India.
 
 Yogananda, Paramahansa. 1946. Autobiography of a Yogi.

Fiction

Chatterjee, Bankim Chandra. [1882] 2014. Anandamath, edited by B. K. Roy.
 Farrell, James G. 1973. The Siege of Krishnapur.
 Forster, E. M. 1924. Passage to India.
 Jhabvala, Ruth Prawer. 1960. The Householder. 
 —— 1975. Heat and Dust.
 Kipling, Rudyard. 1894. The Jungle Book.
 —— 1901. Kim.
Masters, John. 1951. Nightrunners of Bengal.
 Rushdie, Salman. 1981. Midnight's Children.
Scott, Paul. 1965–75. Raj Quartet.
Smith, Zadie. 2000. White Teeth.
Wu Cheng'en. c. 1590s. Journey to the West.

See also

 History of India
 Indian literature
 Indology
 Bibliography of Ganges
 Bibliography of Varanasi
 The Cambridge History of India
 The New Cambridge History of India

References

External links
 The Indian City, 1700 to the Present: A Select Research Bibliography by Vinay Lal
 Banaras Bibliography by Jörg Gengnagel & Axel Michaels

Books about India
 
Bibliographies of countries or regions